Pretzel is a children's picture book written in 1944 by Margret Rey, illustrated by H.A. Rey and first published by Harper & Brothers.

Synopsis
The story begins with the line, "One morning in May, five little dachshunds were born."   Among the five puppies was a male dachshund dubbed Pretzel.  Though unremarkable at first and virtually indistinguishable from the rest of the litter, Pretzel soon grew to be extraordinarily long, much longer than his brothers and sisters.  He grew to be the longest dachshund in the world, earning a blue ribbon at a dog show.  Pretzel was so long that he could in fact twist his body into the shape of his namesake.

His length and physical prowess drew attention and praise from humans and dogs alike, save for one female dachshund named Greta.  Pretzel was smitten by Greta who lived just across the street and who was unimpressed by Pretzel's length; she claimed that she "didn't like long dogs."   Despite Pretzel's efforts to woo her with gifts, she continued to snub his affections.

While watching Greta from afar, Pretzel witnessed Greta's accidental fall into a dry water well.  The well was too deep for Greta to escape on her own, but not so deep that Pretzel couldn't hook onto the rim of the well with his hindquarters, lower his body into the well and extract her with his teeth via the scruff of her neck.  It is after her rescue that Greta returns Pretzel's affections, agrees to marry him despite his length and the story ends with the same line and much the same illustration which opened the story, except the "five little dachshunds" in this case belonged to Pretzel and Greta.

The story was republished in 1997 by Houghton Mifflin.

TV Series
A 3D-animated television series based on the book Pretzel and the Puppies premiered on Apple TV+ on February 11, 2022 with Mark Duplass voicing the title role. A holiday special was released on December 2, 2022. Season 2 was released on February 24, 2023.

References

1944 children's books
American picture books
Books about dogs
Harper & Brothers books